The Girl Dodger is a 1919 American silent comedy film directed by Jerome Storm and written by J.G. Hawks. The film stars Charles Ray, Doris May, Hallam Cooley, Jack Nelson, and Leota Lorraine. The film was released on February 23, 1919, by Paramount Pictures.

Per the Library of Congress, the film is lost

Plot

Cast
Charles Ray as Cuthbert Trotman
Doris May as Anita Graham 
Hallam Cooley as Harry Travistock
Jack Nelson as Billy
Leota Lorraine as Pinkie le Rue

References

External links 
 

1919 films
1910s English-language films
Silent American comedy films
1919 comedy films
Paramount Pictures films
Films directed by Jerome Storm
American black-and-white films
American silent feature films
1910s American films